LZ-2 is one of the main roads on the island of Lanzarote in the Canary Islands. It leads south from the island's capital, Arrecife, ending at the island's southernmost town of Playa Blanca. From here, ferries are available to cross the strait of La Bocayna, effectively connecting the LZ-2 to the FV-1 on the island of Fuerteventura. Lanzarote Airport is also accessed by the LZ-2.

Although most of the island's roads are owned by the island council (cabildo insular), roads of major importance such as the LZ-2 are owned by the Government of the Canary Islands.

The road is a dual carriageway, with two lanes in each direction, between Arrecife and Tías (approximately ); the rest of the route, between Tías and Playa Blanca (approximately ) is a single carriageway.

References

Lanzarote
Roads in Spain